Leroy Haynes (1914–1986) was an expat American restaurateur and actor who resided in Paris, France. As an actor, he appeared in The Butterfly Affair, Bons Baisers de Hong Kong, and Ace High. His restaurant, Chez Haynes was a well known and iconic restaurant which would be visited by well known actors and entertainers.

Background
Leroy "Roughouse" Haynes was born Leroy Howard Milton Haynes in Clinton, Kentucky on January 7, 1914 to parents Robert Haynes and M.C. Curine Lena.  A student of the arts,  he was a  Morehouse graduate who got his Roughouse name from his football days. While in the army he came to Europe. While stationed in Germany, he would come to Paris. In 1949, he married Gabrielle Lecarbonnier, a young French woman. Together they opened "Gabby and Haynes", and later Chez Haynes. Later he acted in movies of the gangster genre. He was also the president of the American Fellowship for a period of time. In Adrian Miller's book Soul Food: The Surprising Story of an American Cuisine, One Plate at a Time, it mentioned a newspaper saying in 1966, that his restaurant and it's down home cooking and soul food would make Haynes America's unofficial ambassador to France. A definite part of Parisian African-American Culinary History, he has been honored by Electra Weston in her performances.

He died in 1986. His widow Maria dos Santos kept running the restaurant for 23 years after his death.

Restaurant
His soul food restaurant was opened in 1949. They would serve fried chicken and chitlins, beans and rice, mashed potatoes, and corn bread. The clientele include African Americans living in Paris as well as others visiting, also white Europeans wanting to try the food. You can see Leroy Haynes and his restaurant in the French film La Bonzesse (1974), directed by François Jouffa.

Actor
An early film role was in 1961, in Un nommé La Rocca, which was directed by Jean Becker. He then appeared in Le gorille a mordu l'archevêque in 1962. His last film was in 1975,  the Yvan Chiffre directed Bons Baisers de Hong Kong.

Filmography

References

External links
 Cinemafrodiscendente: Haynes, Leroy
 
 RuedesCollectionneurs:  Haynes's : 60 years of an American in Paris

1914 births
1986 deaths
American male actors
American restaurateurs
American expatriates in France